Kendall Ciesemier is a writer, producer, and reporter, originally from Wheaton, Illinois. She is also the founder of Kids Caring 4 Kids, a non-profit organization she started at age 11.

Early life and education

Kids Caring 4 Kids 
After watching a special of The Oprah Winfrey Show about the AIDS epidemic in Africa, Ciesemier founded the volunteer organization Kids Caring 4 Kids in 2005.  In May 2007, Ciesemier was named one of America's top ten youth volunteers by Prudential and the National Association of Secondary School Principals. In 2010, she was named one of Glamour Magazine's top ten women of the year for her service work. Ciesemier was also awarded a Daily Point of Light Award for her work doing Kids Caring 4 Kids by Points of Light. The Daily Point of Light Award was created by President George H.W Bush to "honor individuals and groups creating meaningful change in communities across America".

On August 31, 2007, Ciesemier received a surprise visit from US President Bill Clinton at an assembly at Wheaton North High School in recognition of her service.  Clinton and Ciesemier then went to appear on The Oprah Winfrey Show.  The episode was broadcast on September 4, 2007. On the show, Clinton announced that his friend would be donating half-a-million dollars to Ciesemier's organization.

Education 
Ciesemier attended Franklin Middle School in Wheaton, Illinois, where she was a student when she formed Kids Caring 4 Kids. She graduated from Georgetown University in Washington, DC with a Bachelor of Arts in Sociology. While at Georgetown, she co-hosted a radio show called "He Said, She Said" with her older brother Connor, which covered pop culture and current events.

Ciesemier later attended the New York Film Academy for a six-week program in documentary production.

Career 
Ciesemier worked as a production assistant at CBS This Morning during the 2016 presidential election. She later worked as a producer and reporter for both The New York Times''' Opinion Section and Mic.

While at Mic, Ciesemier interviewed Alice Marie Johnson, who was serving life without parole for a first-time nonviolent drug offense. The interview inspired Kim Kardashian to advocate for the clemency of Johnson.

Ciesemier currently works for the American Civil Liberties Union as a host of the podcast At Liberty'' and as a multimedia producer.

Personal life
Ciesemier was born with a rare liver disease called biliary atresia and has undergone two liver transplants at Children's Memorial Hospital in Chicago. In 2010, she was part of the design team for its replacement, the Lurie Children's Hospital. She has stated that her own personal struggles are part of what inspired her to help others.

References

External links 
 

People from Wheaton, Illinois
Date of birth missing (living people)
Place of birth missing (living people)
Living people
Georgetown College (Georgetown University) alumni
Liver transplant recipients
Year of birth missing (living people)